Imminent Threat is a 2015 documentary film about the War on Terror's impact on civil liberties in the US, as well as the potential coalition that may form between the progressive left and libertarian right.  The film is directed by Janek Ambros and executive produced by James Cromwell, Jillian Barba, Anthony A. LoPresti, and D.J. Dodd.

Ambros and Cromwell made their follow up, Mondo hollywoodland in 2021.

See also
 List of American films of 2015
 Military-industrial complex
 Military Keynesianism

References

2015 films
2015 documentary films
Documentary films about American politics
Documentary films about the Iraq War
Military–industrial complex
Civil liberties in the United States
2010s English-language films
2010s American films